Hagnoundrou is a village in the commune of Bouéni in Mayotte.

History

Références 
Populated places in Mayotte